Erzurum GSIM Ice Arena, is an indoor  ice hockey arena located at Yakutiye district of Erzurum, eastern Turkey. It was opened in 2009.

The arena complex, owned by the Youth and Sport Directorate of Erzurum Province (GSİM), consists of two Olympic-size rinks in two buildings constructed side by side. The bigger venue has a seating capacity for 3,000 people while the smaller hall holds 500 spectators. 3000-seat hall hosts the men's ice hockey team of the Erzurum Gençlik SK and the 500-seat hall the women's team. Both teams play in the Turkish Ice Hockey Super League and the Turkish Ice Hockey Women's League respectively.

International events hosted
25th Winter Universiade – Ice hockey – January 27 – February 6, 2011 
11th IIHF World Championship Division III – April 15–21, 2012
2017 European Youth Olympic Winter Festival – February 12–17, 2017

See also
 GSIM Yenişehir Ice Hockey Hall

References

Indoor arenas in Turkey
Ice hockey venues in Turkey
Sports venues in Erzurum
2009 establishments in Turkey
Sports venues completed in 2009
Figure skating in Turkey